Burnham Baroque is an architectural style developed by American architect Daniel Burnham at the end of the 19th and start of the 20th century. It relies heavily on a stripped Classicism with Baroque and Beaux-Arts inflections. It was popular primarily during the first three decades of the 20th century, particularly among designers of railroad stations.

Genesis and character of the style
The term was coined in 1956 by architectural historian Carroll L.V. Meeks in his book The Railroad Station: An Architectural History. Meeks credits Burham's staff architect, Charles B. Atwood, with the genesis of the design. Consulting with railroad engineer J.F. Wallace, who ensured that the layout and tracks conformed to accepted industrial practice, Atwood designed the temporary railroad station which served the 1893 World's Columbian Exposition in Chicago, Illinois. Atwood's use of the triumphal arch and colonnade in this structure was widely praised, and Meeks says Burnham strongly embraced the new style after the exposition. Burnham Baroque became Daniel Burnham's favored architectural idiom.

Burnham Baroque relies heavily on Classicism, with restrained Baroque and Beaux-Arts styles often incorporated into a building's fundamental structure (such as arches) as well as its details and ornament. Architectural historian Francis Morrone has gone further, arguing that Burnham Baroque combines the Chicago school with the Neoclassic and Beaux-Arts elements used by the City Beautiful movement. But where the City Beautiful movement "slathers" ornamentation over a building, Burnham Baroque uses ornament to accentuate structure.

Example structures

Burnham Baroque was a highly influential architectural style. Burnham Baroque was one of five architectural styles utilized by the architectural firm of Graham, Anderson, Probst & White in the 1920s. It was widely mimicked by architects designing large American metropolitan railroad stations.

Examples of Burnham Baroque include:
Birmingham Terminal Station, Birmingham, Alabama (1909; P. Thornton Marye, architect)
Flatiron Building, New York City, New York (1910; Daniel Burnham and Frederick P. Dinkelberg, architects)
Grand Central Station, New York City, New York (1903; Reed & Stern and Warren and Wetmore, architects)
State Bank of Chicago Building, Chicago, Illinois (1928; Graham, Anderson, Probst & White, architects)
Union Station, Pittsburgh, Pennsylvania  (1907; Daniel Burnham, architect)
Union Station, Tacoma, Washington (1910; Reed & Stern, architects)
Union Station, Worcester, Massachusetts (1911; Watson & Huckel, architects)
Union Trust Building, Cleveland, Ohio (1924; Graham, Anderson, Probst & White, architects)
Wabash Pittsburgh Terminal, Pittsburgh, Pennsylvania (1904; Theodore Link, architect)
Washington Union Station, Washington, D.C. (1907; Daniel Burnham, architect)

References
Notes

Citations

Bibliography

Neoclassical architecture
Neoclassicism
Revival architectural styles
Architectural styles
19th-century architecture
20th-century architecture